Wilkinson Call (January 9, 1834August 24, 1910) was an American lawyer and politician who represented Florida in the United States Senate from 1879 to 1897.

Biography

Wilkinson Call, nephew of Territorial Governor of Florida Richard K. Call and cousin of Florida governor David S. Walker and U.S. Senator from Arkansas James D. Walker, was born on January 9, 1834, in Logan County, Kentucky. He was the son of Dr. George W. Call and Lucinda Lee. His mother was a member of the prominent Lee family of Virginia. Kentucky senator John J. Crittenden was his uncle by marriage.

By the late 1830s, his parents relocated to Tallahassee, Florida. Call subsequently moved to Jacksonville, Florida, where he studied law and was admitted to the bar and entered practice. By the late 1840s, he entered into a law practice with his cousin David S. Walker in Tallahassee. Call served as adjutant general in the Confederate Army during the Civil War.

Call was elected to represent Florida in the United States Senate as a Democrat on December 29, 1865, but was not permitted to enter office by the Republican majority there, like many other Confederate leaders. He subsequently served as a member of the Democratic National Committee and again practiced law in Jacksonville.

He was elected, again, as a Democrat to the United States Senate January 21, 1879 and was reelected to his seat January 20, 1885, and May 26, 1891, and served from March 1879 to March 1897 (with a brief vacancy due to the legislature's failure to elect by March 1891). Along with Napoleon Bonaparte Broward, Call became a leader of the Democratic Party's populist agrarian faction, influenced by Florida's agrarian movement of the 1890s. Call actively supported and campaigned for William Jennings Bryan when the latter ran for President of the United States in the 1896 election. Florida Governor William D. Bloxham named John A. Henderson to serve until the state legislature selected a successor for Call. The U.S. Senate, believing Bloxham had overstepped gubernatorial authority, refused to allow Henderson to take office, leaving the matter to the Florida legislature. After several ballots and no decisive victor, Call withdrew and threw his support behind Stephen Mallory II, who won the seat. In the U.S. Senate, Call served as chairman of the Committee on Civil Service and Retrenchment during the 53rd Congress and also served on the Committee on Patents.

Upon retiring from the United States Senate, Call resided in Washington, D.C., until his death on August 24, 1910. He was interred in Oak Hill Cemetery. His daughter Lucy Lee Call was a noted opera singer who performed for the New York Metropolitan Opera. A nephew Rhydon M. Call was a long-serving federal court judge in Florida.

References

External links

1834 births
1910 deaths
Florida Democrats
Democratic Party United States senators from Florida
Burials at Oak Hill Cemetery (Washington, D.C.)
People from Russellville, Kentucky
People of Florida in the American Civil War
People from Jacksonville, Florida
People from Tallahassee, Florida
19th-century American politicians
Washington, D.C., Democrats